Krishna Kumar Toor is an Urdu poet whose collection Ghurfa-i-Ghalib won the 2012 Sahitya Akademi Award for Urdu.

References

Urdu-language poets
Recipients of the Sahitya Akademi Award in Urdu
Living people
Year of birth missing (living people)